Mostafa Mofidi (born 1941) is an Iranian translator.

Collections of translation in Persian 
Novels
 Fuentes, Carlos, Distant Relations, 2002, Niloofar Publications. . 
 Allende, Isabel, A portrait in Sepia, 2002, Niloofar Publications. . 
 Cortazar, Jolio, Final Exam, 2003, Niloofar Publications. . 
 Sabato, Ernest, On Heroes And Tombs, 2nd edition, 2011. Niloofar Publications. . 
 Arguedas, Jose Maria, Deep Rivers, 2007. Niloofar publications. . 
 Sabato, Ernesto, The Tunnel, 2008, Niloofar publications. .
 Mcewan, Ian, Atonement, 2012, Niloofar Publications.

References

External links 
 information in Radio-Farda 
 Interview 
 critic in Mag Iran  
 interview in KhabarOnline
 critic in MahMag 
 critic in bfm.ir

Iranian translators
1941 births
Living people
People from Tehran